Douhua is a Chinese sweet or savoury snack made with very tender tofu. It is also referred to as doufuhua, tofu pudding, soybean pudding or, particularly in northern China, tofu brains.

History 
Tofu is thought to have originated in ancient China during the Han Dynasty. Liu An, the grandson of Emperor Gaozu of Han, was ambitious and wanted to invent something to make people live forever. Even though he failed to make the magic pill, he used soybean and bittern to finally get niveous and tender tofu, which was surprisingly tasty. People named it "tofu brains" because of its softness. Tofu brains then became a popular snack during Han Dynasty. In the next 2000 years, it gradually spread throughout China. 

During the Second Sino-Japanese War, Sichuan became the political, economical, and military center of China. The boss of a famous Douhua restaurant, Liu Xilu, learnt the methods of making beancurd from others and innovated on them until he finally came up with his own "secret recipe", which greatly improved its taste.

Names

Regional variants 
Variants of douhua can be broadly divided into three groups: savoury (鹹), spicy (辣) and sweet (甜).

Savoury 

In Northern China, Douhua is often eaten with soy sauce, thus resulting in a savory flavor. Northern Chinese often refer to douhua as tofu brains. Each region may differ in seasonings. Inland cities add chopped meat, pickles or zha cai, and mushrooms, while coastal cities add seaweed and small shrimp.  Tofu brains can be found at breakfast stands along the streets in the morning, usually with eggs or youtiao (fried dough sticks). Other times it is hard to find outside of a restaurant.

Spicy 

In Sichuan and neighboring Shaanxi, douhua is often flavored with chilli oil and Sichuan peppers to make it spicy.  It is served by carrying pole or bicycle vendors with several condiments such as chili oil, soy sauce, scallions, and nuts. A famous Sichuan dish, spicy tofu fish (豆花鱼) uses douhua as an essential ingredient.

Sweet 

In Southern China, Douhua is often eaten with sweet flavoring. Southern China often refers to Douhua as tofu pudding. It is served with sweet ginger or clear syrup. In summer, people eat cold Douhua to relieve themselves of the heat. In winter, people add hot sweet water and beans into Douhua to dispel cold. Hong Kong people add sesame paste into Douhua.

Taiwanese and Cantonese douhua are a symbol of Southern Chinese cuisine, and often served as a part of yum cha.

In Southeast Asia, douhua is almost always sweet, although condiments vary widely.

Filipino cuisine

In the Philippines, it is more commonly known as taho. It is a fresh silken tofu served in sweet brown syrup and sago pearls. It is usually peddled by hawkers in the mornings, by door-to-door or in public plazas, or outside churches. In some regional variations, taho is often served with sugarcane syrup, ube syrup or strawberry syrup.

Indonesian cuisine

In Indonesia, it is known as Kembang tahu or in Java as Tahwa derived from the Chinese Hokkien name Tau Hwe, or Wedang Tahu (ꦮꦺꦢꦁ​​ꦠꦲꦸ) (Wedang means hot beverage and Tahu means tofu in Javanese) and is usually sold by hawkers. It is served warm or cold with palm sugar syrup that has been flavored with pandan leaves and ginger.

Malaysian and Singaporean cuisine
In Malaysia and Singapore, it is more commonly known by its names tau hua or tau huay in Hokkien, or by the Cantonese name (tau fu fa), with the Cantonese variation being more common in Malaysia. In Penang, the common term is tau hua, due to Hokkien being its dominant local Chinese language. In Kelantan, the dish is known as pati soya.

It is usually served either with a clear sweet syrup alone, with ginkgo seeds suspended in the syrup, or in a sugar syrup infused with pandan. Alternatively, it can also be served with palm syrup (Gula Melaka).

Thai cuisine
In Thailand, it is known by its Chinese Hokkien name taohuai (เต้าฮวย). It is usually served cold with milk and fruit salad, which is known as taohuai nom sot (เต้าฮวยนมสด, literally "douhua in fresh milk") or taohuai fruit salad (เต้าฮวยฟรุตสลัด), or served hot with ginger syrup, which is known as taohuai nam khing (เต้าฮวยน้ำขิง).

Vietnamese cuisine
In Vietnam, it is known as tàu hủ nước đường, tàu hủ hoa or tào phớ, đậu hủ, tàu hủ. It varies in three regions in Vietnam:
 Northern region — served with jasmine infused sugary water. It is enjoyed as warm in winter and cold with ice in summer.
 Central region — cooked with spicy ginger. Sugar is added. Douhua pieces are usually unshaped because of their softness.
 Southern region — served warm with lychee and coconut water. Ginger is optional. Douhua pieces are firmer than those in the North and the Central.

Nutritional value and health benefits 

Douhua is rich in nutrients, contains iron, calcium, phosphorus, magnesium and other trace elements necessary for the human body. It also contains sugar, vegetable oil, and high-quality protein. The digestion and absorption rate of tofu is more than 95%.

In addition to its function of increasing nutrition and helping digestion, tofu is also beneficial to the growth and development of teeth and bones. It can increase iron element in people's blood in the hematopoietic function; tofu does not contain cholesterol, which is very beneficial to people with hypertension, high blood lipids, hypercholesterolemia, arteriosclerosis, and coronary artery disease. It is a valuable food supplement for children and the elders. 

Tofu is rich in phytoestrogens as well, which has an effect on preventing and inhibiting osteoporosis, breast cancer, prostate cancer, and blood cancer. The sterols and stigmasterol in tofu are both effective ingredients for suppressing cancer.

Packaged
The dessert is also sold in North American Asian supermarkets in plastic containers.

Requirements
Like all tofu, douhua must have a coagulant, often gluconolactone for smoothness as compared with other coagulants.

In popular culture
Tofu pudding was featured on the Netflix TV series, Street Food, in the Chiayi, Taiwan episode.

See also

 Dim sum
Tofu
Taho
 List of tofu dishes

References

Cantonese cuisine
Chinese desserts
Hong Kong desserts
Sichuan cuisine
Singaporean cuisine
Taiwanese cuisine
Tofu dishes